The following lists events that happened during 1993 in Cape Verde.

Incumbents
President: António Mascarenhas Monteiro
Prime Minister: Carlos Veiga

Events
Cape Verde ratified the UN treaties, the International Covenant on Economic, Social and Cultural Rights and the International Covenant on Civil and Political Rights
February 7: the delimitation treaty between Cape Verde and Senegal was signed
September 1: The government separated the commercial functions from the (central) Bank of Cape Verde, establishing Banco Comercial do Atlântico

Sports
Académica do Sal won the Cape Verdean Football Championship

Births
Elida Almeida, singer
January 22: Kukula, footballer
February 9: Patrick Andrade, footballer
November 1: António Correia, footballer

References

 
Years of the 20th century in Cape Verde
1990s in Cape Verde
Cape Verde
Cape Verde